The South Africa cricket team toured New Zealand in February and March 2022 to play two Test matches. The Test series formed part of the 2021–2023 ICC World Test Championship. In September 2021, the tour dates were changed slightly due to COVID-19 quarantine requirements for travelling to New Zealand. In November 2021, New Zealand Cricket confirmed the full dates of the tour.

The initial tour schedule had the second Test at the Basin Reserve. However, on 27 January 2022, New Zealand Cricket announced a change to the itinerary, with all the matches moved to the Hagley Oval.

New Zealand won the first Test match inside three days, by an innings and 276 runs. In their first innings, South Africa were bowled out for 95 runs. It was the first time they had been bowled out for less than 100 runs in the first innings of a Test match since 1932. It was South Africa's second-biggest defeat, in terms of innings, in Test cricket, and their first loss to New Zealand since March 2004. South Africa won the second Test by 198 runs to draw the series 1–1, maintaining their unbeaten Test series run against New Zealand.

Squads

Ahead of the tour, South Africa's Keegan Petersen was ruled out of the series due to COVID-19 with Zubayr Hamza named as his replacement.

Test series

1st Test

2nd Test

Notes

References

External links
 Series home at ESPN Cricinfo

2022 in New Zealand cricket
2022 in South African cricket
International cricket competitions in 2021–22
South African cricket tours of New Zealand